Pradeep Kumar Khosla (born March 13, 1957) is an Indian-American computer scientist and university administrator.

Khosla was elected a member of the National Academy of Engineering in 2006 for contributions to design and sensor-based control in robotic systems for the assembly of high-precision electronics and for leadership in engineering education.

He is the current chancellor of the University of California, San Diego. He was appointed to the position by the president of the University of California, Mark Yudof, on May 3, 2012. His term began August 1, 2012, following the resignation of the previous chancellor Marye Anne Fox.

A native of Mumbai (then Bombay), India, he was an electrical engineering professor and Dean of the Carnegie Mellon College of Engineering. He was also the Philip and Marsha Dowd University Professor of Electrical and Computer Engineering and Robotics at Carnegie Mellon. 
He is also the Jury Chair for the Infosys Prize since 2011, for the discipline of Engineering and Computer Science.

Career

Khosla received a Bachelor of Technology degree with honors from IIT Kharagpur in 1980. After graduating, he worked in the area of real-time control with Tata Consulting Engineers and Siemens until 1982.

By 1986, he had received both an MS and PhD degree from Carnegie Mellon University, where he then became an assistant professor. He rose through the ranks and was appointed University Professor in 2008, which is the highest rank attainable by a professor.  He held several administrative and leadership positions at CMU including: Founding Director, Carnegie Mellon CyLab; Head, Department of Electrical and Computer Engineering; Director, Information Networking Institute; and Founding Director, Institute for Complex Engineered Systems (ICES). In 2004, Khosla was appointed Dean of the Carnegie Institute of Technology, a five-year term which was renewed in July 2009.

From January 1994 to August 1996, Khosla was on leave from CMU and served as Program Manager at DARPA, where he managed a $50M portfolio of programs in real-time systems, internet-enabled software infrastructure, intelligent systems, and distributed systems.

Khosla also worked as a consultant to several companies and venture capitalists and has served on the technology advisory boards of many start-ups. Currently he serves on the advisory boards for iNetworks LLC, ITU Ventures, and Alcoa CIO. He is involved with iNetworks in raising a biotechnology fund called BioVentures, and is co-founder and a member of the board of directors of Quantapoint, BioMetricore, and No Fuss Inc. He also serves on the boards of HCL Infosystems, the Children’s Institute, the IIT Foundation, Mellon-Pitt (MPC) corporation, the Pittsburgh Tissue Engineering Initiative (PTEI), the Doyle Center, the Pittsburgh Technology Council, and Avigilon. In addition, he serves on the advisory boards of several universities and government organizations. He is a member of the IT advisory committee, CSIRO, Australia, ITU High Level Experts Group for the Global Cybersecurty Agenda (GCA), the Visiting Committee on Advanced Technology for NIST, and the World Economic Forum’s Global Agenda Council on Innovation. He has served on the Strategy Review Board of the Ministry of Science and Technology, Taiwan; Council of Deans of the Aeronautics Advisory Committee, NASA; National Research Council Board on Manufacturing and Engineering Design; eTreasury Pennsylvania Advisory Board (appointed by Pennsylvania Treasurer Robin Weissman), and Senior Advisory Group for the DARPA Program on Joint Unmanned Combat Air Systems.

In 2012, Khosla was appointed the eighth chancellor of the University of California, San Diego.

He chaired the Engineering and Computer Science jury for the Infosys Prize from 2011 to 2018.

Research

Khosla’s research has resulted in three books and more than 350 journal articles and conference and book contributions. His interests are multidisciplinary encompassing the areas of internet-enabled collaborative design and distributed manufacturing, collaborating autonomous systems, agent-based architectures for distributed design and embedded control, software composition and reconfigurable software for real-time embedded systems, reconfigurable and distributed robotic systems, integrated design-assembly planning systems and distributed information systems.

Achievements

Khosla is a frequent keynote speaker at international conferences, and invited to participate in thought leadership forums organized by Fortune Magazine, AMD, the Milken Institute, the World Economic Forum, Techonomy, and the Blouin Foundation, amongst others. He has also served on editorial boards of journals and book series.
He is the recipient of several awards including the ASEE George Westinghouse Award for Education in 1999, the Silicon-India Leadership award for Excellence in Academics and Technology (2000), the W. Wallace McDowell Award from IEEE Computer Society (2001), the Cyber Education Champion Award from the Business Software Alliance (2007), Lifetime Achievement Award of the Computers and Information in Engineering Division of the American Society of Mechanical Engineers (ASME) (2009), and the Pan IIT Academic Excellence Award (2009).  For his contributions to technology and education, he has been elected as a Fellow of IEEE (1995), the American Association of Artificial Intelligence (AAAI) (2003), the American Association for the Advancement of Science (AAAS) (2004), the American Society of Mechanical Engineers (ASME) (2010), and member of the National Academy of Engineering (NAE) (2006). Khosla was also selected to join the prestigious Council on Competitiveness' Technology Leadership Strategy Initiative (TLSI), a collaborative effort designed to chart the most promising frontiers of technology and competitive advantage arenas for the United States. Khosla was appointed as the chair of the Association of Public and Land-grant Universities's Commission on Innovation, Competitiveness and Economic Prosperity which under his charged produced a landmark report on university innovation, "Technology Transfer Evolution: Driving Economic Prosperity."

References

Carnegie Mellon University faculty
University of California, San Diego administrators
American computer scientists
Indian computer scientists
Living people
IIT Kharagpur alumni
Carnegie Mellon University alumni
Fellow Members of the IEEE
Fellows of the Association for the Advancement of Artificial Intelligence
Fellows of the American Association for the Advancement of Science
Members of the United States National Academy of Engineering
Chancellors of the University of California, San Diego
American academics of Indian descent
People from Mumbai
1957 births